{{DISPLAYTITLE:DMol3}}
DMol3 is a commercial (and academic) software package which uses density functional theory with a numerical radial function basis set to calculate the electronic properties of molecules, clusters, surfaces and crystalline solid materials

from first principles. DMol3 can either use gas phase boundary conditions or 3D periodic boundary conditions for solids or simulations of lower-dimensional periodicity. It has also pioneered the use of the conductor-like screening model COSMO Solvation Model for quantum simulations of solvated molecules and recently of wetted surfaces. DMol3 permits geometry optimisation and saddle point search with and without geometry constraints, as well as calculation of a variety of derived properties of the electronic configuration. DMol3 development started in the early eighties with B. Delley then associated with A.J. Freeman and D.E. Ellis at Northwestern University. In 1989 DMol3 appeared as DMol, the first commercial density functional package for industrial use by Biosym Technologies now Accelrys. Delley's 1990 publication was cited more than 3000 times.

See also 

 Quantum chemistry computer programs

External links 
 DMol3 datasheet
 developers page
 Materials Studio

References 

Computational chemistry software
Density functional theory software
Physics software